When the Devil Drives may refer to:

 When the Devil Drives, serialised version of Shoal Water, 1940 novel by Dornford Yates
 When the Devil Drives (film), 1922 American silent film